Hwangap in Korean,  in Japanese or Jiazi in Chinese, is a traditional way of celebrating one's 61st birthday in Korea. It is technically the 60th birthday, but in Korean age, the person would be celebrating their 61st. The number 60 means accomplishing one big 60-year cycle and starting another one in one's life following the traditional 60-year calendar cycle of the lunar calendar. In the traditional way of counting ages, one began a new 60-year cycle on New Year's Day, when everyone became a year older. Thus people who were 60 and had completed their first 60-year cycle entered their second cycle on the New Year's Day when they turned 61 and returned to the same combination of zodiacal symbols that governed the year of their birth. Under the currently popular western method of counting ages, however, one enters one's second cycle on one's 60th birthday. The traditional cycles still remain, but the way of counting ages has changed by one year.

In the past, a person's average life expectancy was much lower than today, so Hwangap also meant a celebration of longevity. The celebration party is also a wish for an even longer and more prosperous life. This party is customarily thrown by the children of the person who is turning 60, unless that person does not have any children, in which case there's no party at all. On one's Hwangap family and relatives prepare a big birthday celebration with much food.

With the increasingly longer life spans of people these days, the Hwangap celebration has been given a lesser significance than before; typically, only close family members get together to have a big meal. Many Koreans now take trips with their families instead of having a big party to celebrate their 60th birthdays. Parties are also thrown when a person reaches 70 (called Gohi or Chilsun) or 80 (Palsun) years of age.

See also

Second Bar Mitzvah
Dol-janchi, the one year birthday celebration in Korea

References

Age and society
Chinese culture
Japanese culture
Korean culture
East Asian traditions